Bull's-eye window  may refer to:
Oeil-de-boeuf, an ornamental window with a circular frame
A window made from crown glass
Porthole, a circular nautical window
Oculus (architecture), a skylight at the top of a dome

See also
Bullseye Glass, an American company
Fresnel lens